Franceschi is a surname. Notable people with the surname include:

 Paolo Franceschi (c.1540-1596), also known as Paolo Fiammingo, Flemish painter, lived in Venice
 Piero della Francesca (c. 1420 – 1492), also called Piero de' Franceschi, Italian painter
 Francesco Franceschi (died c. 1599), engraver and patriarch of the Franceschi printing family
 Vittore de Franceschi, Italian Roman Catholic Bishop of Famagusta 

 Alberto Franceschi (born 1947), Venezuelan politician and businessman
 Antonia Franceschi (born 1960), American actress and choreographer
 Aristide Franceschi (died 1930), Italian underwater diver
 Claude Franceschi (born 1942), French angiologist 
 Ernesto Franceschi (1912–1943), Italian bobsledder 
 Francesco de' Franceschi (fl.1443–1468), Italian Renaissance painter
 Francesco Franceschi (horticulturist) (1843–1924), Italian horticulturist
 François Franceschi-Losio (1770–1810), Italo-French general
 Giovanni Franceschi (born 1963), Italian medley swimmer
 Giovanni Franceschi (born 1963), Italian swimmer and medalist
 Giulia Civita Franceschi (1870–1957), Italian educator
 Héctor, Franceschi M (born 1925), Venezuelan general, former commander of TO3 & TO5
 Jean-Baptiste Franceschi (born 1983), French midfielder football player  
 Jean Baptiste Marie Franceschi-Delonne (1767–1810), French general and noble
 Jean Baptiste, baron Franceschi (1766–1813), French general
 Jean-Louis Franceschi (born 1947), Général of the French Army and Commandant of the French Foreign Legion
 Josh Franceschi (born 1990), frontman of You Me at Six
 Juan "Papo" Franceschi (c. 1946 – 20 October 1990), Puerto Rican track and field athlete
 Michel Vergé-Franceschi (born 1951), French naval historian
 Patrice Franceschi (born 1954), French pilot who flew an ultralight around the world
 Pete Franceschi (1919–1989), American football player
 Raffaele Franceschi (born 1960), Italian swimmer and medalist
 Sara Franceschi (born 1999), Italian swimmer
 Vera Franceschi (1926–1966), Italian American pianist 

Molini Franceschi, a municipality in Croatia in the Split-Dalmatia County

See also
 Franceschini
 Francesconi
 Franceschetti

Italian-language surnames
Patronymic surnames
Surnames from given names
it:Franceschi